Putzarer See is a lake in the Vorpommern-Greifswald district in Mecklenburg-Vorpommern, Germany.

External links 
 

Lakes of Mecklenburg-Western Pomerania
Nature reserves in Mecklenburg-Western Pomerania